Santa Maria degli Angeli is a Gothic-style, Roman Catholic church located on Via Provesi #39 in Busseto, region of Emilia-Romagna, Italy.

History
The church and the adjacent Franciscan convent were erected between 1470 and 1474, under the patronage of the Pallavicini. Inside, in a rocaille Niche is sheltered the terracotta statues of Grieving over the Dead Christ (1476–77) by Guido Mazzoni.

Other works are a Deposition (circa 1543-44) by Nicolò dell'Abate and a Madonna and Franciscan Saints (1580 cc) by Antonio Campi.

The convent was suppressed in 1810, but reopened in 1816.

References

Churches in the province of Parma
Roman Catholic churches in Emilia-Romagna
Gothic architecture in Emilia-Romagna
15th-century Roman Catholic church buildings in Italy
Roman Catholic churches completed in 1474